The Alabama Black Belt National Heritage Area is a National Heritage Area encompassing Bibb, Bullock, Butler, Choctaw, Clarke, Conecuh, Dallas, Greene, Hale, Lowndes, Macon, Marengo, Monroe, Montgomery, Perry, Pickens, Sumter, Washington, and Wilcox counties in the Black Belt region of Alabama. The Center for the Study of the Black Belt at the University of West Alabama serves as the local coordinating authority.  

The Alabama Black Belt National Heritage Area was designated on January 5, 2023, as part of the National Heritage Area Act of 2022, which created the National Heritage Area System under the National Park Service.

Landmarks  
The Alabama Black Belt National Heritage Area includes several natural landmarks. The entirety of Tuskegee National Forest is located in Macon County, while Talladega National Forest overlaps with part of the heritage area in Bibb, Perry, Hale and Dallas counties. The Cahaba River National Wildlife Refuge is located primarily in Bibb, while the Choctaw National Wildlife Refuge is primarily located in Bibb, Conecuh, Monroe and Sumter counties. Bladon Springs, Brierfield Ironworks Historical, Chickasaw, Paul M. Grist and Roland Cooper state parks are all located within the heritage area.   

The Alabama Black Belt National Heritage Area includes at least two sites of importance to Native American history in the Moundville Archaeological Site (in Hale County) and the Jere Shine site (in Montgomery County).  It also includes several historic landmarks relevant to African-American history in Alabama, including the Tuskegee Institute and Tuskegee Airmen National Historic Sites, as well as Civil Rights-relevant landmarks such as the Selma to Montgomery National Historic Trail (including the Edmund Pettus Bridge), the Dexter Avenue and First Baptist churches and the Brown Chapel A.M.E. Church. In addition, it includes several museums and memorials such as the National Voting Rights Museum, The Legacy Museum, the National Memorial for Peace and Justice, the Freedom Rides Museum, the Rosa Parks Museum and the Alabama State University Historic District.

References

External links 

 https://www.alblackbeltheritage.com/

National Heritage Areas of the United States
Black Belt (U.S. region)
Protected areas established in 2023
2023 establishments in Alabama
Protected areas of Bibb County, Alabama
Bullock County, Alabama
Butler County, Alabama
Choctaw County, Alabama
Clarke County, Alabama
Conecuh County, Alabama
Protected areas of Dallas County, Alabama
Greene County, Alabama
Protected areas of Hale County, Alabama
Protected areas of Lowndes County, Alabama
Protected areas of Macon County, Alabama
Protected areas of Marengo County, Alabama
Monroe County, Alabama
Protected areas of Montgomery County, Alabama
Protected areas of Perry County, Alabama
Protected areas of Pickens County, Alabama
Protected areas of Sumter County, Alabama
Washington County, Alabama
Protected areas of Wilcox County, Alabama